Cryptopygiella is a genus of flies in the family Dolichopodidae from Dominica. It contains only one species, Cryptopygiella musaphila.

References

Dolichopodidae genera
Medeterinae
Diptera of North America
Monotypic Diptera genera
Taxa named by Harold E. Robinson
Insects of the Caribbean
Endemic fauna of Dominica